The 1983 UEFA Cup Final was played on 4 May 1983 and 18 May 1983 between Anderlecht of Belgium and Benfica of Portugal. Anderlecht won 2–1 on aggregate.

Route to the final

Match details

First leg

Second leg

See also
1982–83 UEFA Cup
R.S.C. Anderlecht in European football
S.L. Benfica in international football

References
RSSSF
Linguasport

2
1982–83 UEFA Cup
International club association football competitions hosted by Belgium
International club association football competitions hosted by Portugal
UEFA Cup Final 1983
UEFA Cup Final 1983
UEFA Cup Finals
Uefa
UEFA
UEFA Cup final
UEFA Cup final, 1983
UEFA Cup final, 1983
Sports competitions in Brussels
Sports competitions in Lisbon